Guru Nanak Fifth Centenary school Mussoorie (G.N.F.C.S) is a Sikh, international, English medium school in India, Mussoorie. G.N.F.C.S is a boarding school with two separate campuses for boys and girls. The short name for the boys' school is Vincent-Hill while the girls' school is called Shangri-La. G.N.F.C School is located in Mussoorie hill station in Uttrakhand. Vincent-Hill was officially established on 1969 and Shangri-La was founded on 1977.

History 
The school was earlier known as Vincent Hill School. It was managed by Seventh-day Adventists till 1969 when S. Mehtab Singh acquired it.
S. Mehtab Singh founded G.N.F.C school in honor of Guru Nanak's 500th birthday anniversary, which was in November 1969. The Fifth Centenary School Society was formed to manage the affairs of the institution. It was registered under the Indian Societies Registration Act, in June 1970.

Location 
G.N.F.C school is located on the footstep of a Himalayan mountain called Mussoorie in the Uttarakhand State. The school is located 6750 feet above sea level and is on an 11-acre plot of land. The hill is covered with various kinds of trees, but it is the home for the famous Himalayan cedar tree. The school is about 2 km away from the Mussoorie library point.

Affiliation 
G.N.F.C school is affiliated with the Council for the Indian School Certificate Examinations.The School is affiliated with Indian Certificate of Secondary Education (ICSE) for class 10 examination and is affiliated with Indian School Certificate (ISC) for class 12 examinations which are both conducted by the Council for the Indian School Certificate Examinations, New Delhi.

Houses 
There are 4 houses namely Attari, Ajit, Nalwa and Ranjit.

Academic program 
The school provides student with two academic streams: a science track and a commerce track. Students can opt for either science or commerce after entering grade 9. After completing ICSE courses, students will have one more opportunity to select their desired line of academic study. The school year is divided into two academic sessions called Midterm (March – June) and final (July to November). In each session there are 2 monthly tests for students above grade 7th and 3 monthly tests for students in Kindergarten to 6th grade.

Co Curricular Activities 
The school also conducts quizzes, debates, elocutions, recitations, annual house plays etc. Students actively participate in these activities throughout the year. At the end of the year, those students who perform well in these activities are awarded with trophies and certificates. Students are also invited to participate in sport activities which is held every evening. Students can play any sport of their choice and are awarded with credits for doing so. Students are also given special training in the month of February in various sports like swimming, football, hockey, basketball, cricket, etc. Many students have also been selected in state competitions also.

References

External links
 

Sikhism in India
International schools in India
Primary schools in India
High schools and secondary schools in Uttarakhand
Boarding schools in Uttarakhand
Education in Dehradun district
Mussoorie
Educational institutions established in 1969
1969 establishments in Uttar Pradesh